The scaly-footed small-eared shrew (Cryptotis squamipes) is a species of mammal in the family Soricidae. It is found in Colombia and Ecuador.

References

Cryptotis
Mammals of Colombia
Mammals of Ecuador
Taxonomy articles created by Polbot
Mammals described in 1912